Jocie Guo (born 21 March 1982), also known as Guo Mei Mei, is a Singaporean female singer who made her first appearance on the entertainment scene in the middle of 2005. She is signed under Singapore record company Play Music which practises packaging and marketing their new artistes as cartoon caricatures on album covers and music videos. Guo was depicted as a sweet innocent cartoon girl and became famous within weeks of her debut single release.

Singing career 
The former Singapore Polytechnic student has been an instant success, with her two singles selling a combined 55,000 copies. Guo is viewed as Warner Music Taiwan's priority artiste with an extensive multimillion-dollar marketing campaign planned for her regional debut and poised to follow in the footsteps of Warner's top Singaporean artiste, Stefanie Sun Yanzi. Her two music videos alone cost a staggering $250,000 to shoot, with top director Lai Wei-kang at the helm.

Guo was the first artiste to be granted legal copyrights to sing Mice Love Rice outside of China; the resulting hit single was the first to make it to the top of Singapore's RIAS sales chart in 2005. Her first album in 2006, 不怕不怕 (No More Panic), out-competed its competitors and became number one on the RIAS sales chart only 10 days after its release. When released in Taiwan, it would sell more than 60,000 copies and attained Platinum status. For Singapore's 2006 May-Day concert, she was invited to perform alongside other big Singaporean stars such as Stefanie Sun in front of a crowd of 20,000. Guo won many "best newcomer" type awards in 2006 such as the "Best Female Newcomer" award from both the 3rd Annual Hit King Awards event that was held in Guangzhou, China and the 6th Annual Global Chinese Music Award Ceremony; she would also win "Best Newcomer" during the Guangdong Radio Station's 9+2 Billboard Music Pioneer Awards Ceremony along with "2006's Most Popular Song" award for her "Bu Pa Bu Pa" single.

In April 2007, Guo performed at Ray Media's 7th Annual Music Awards Ceremony. Also in 2007, Guo received her first six-figure deal to advertise for the Hong Bao Lai ice-cream company in China. Previously, she had also endorsed for Sa Sa Cosmetics and Aji Tei Kyoto Sabo. During 2008, Guo's second album My Darling reached number 2 on Hong Kong's TVB8 Chart and was awarded "Best Newcomer".

Discography
Guo's debut single includes the cover of the song, Mice Love Rice, with various remixes.

Her second single, No More Panic, a Chinese-language cover version of Dragostea Din Tei by O-Zone, was released in early November 2005.

Guo's debut album, No More Panic, which was released in January 2006, is based on her previous hit single No More Panic and titled the same. The album contained new songs and covers that range from catchy mid-tempo tunes to acoustic folk and sentimental numbers. One of the songs, 勾勾手, was used as the ending theme of the Singaporean drama Love Concierge (爱的掌门人).

Guo also published two more albums for Christmas (2006) and Chinese New Year (2007). She released her next album titled My Darling on 22 October 2007. The album included a cover of Ann Winsborn's La La Love on My Mind. In the following year towards the end of May, a CD+DVD version of My Darling was released and made available worldwide; it contained 2 bonus tracks and a DVD with 5 of her music videos for My Darling.

About a year later, Guo would become the singer for the opening theme song, 放了爱, written by lyricist XiaoHan, and the ending theme song, 许愿树, for the 2009 Singaporean drama Perfect Cut 2 (一切完美2).

Albums

References

External links
 Jocie Guo Mei Mei 郭美美 website, videos, discography and latest news at https://web.archive.org/web/20100322233618/http://www.jocieguo.com/ 
 Jocie Guo's profile at Warner Music Singapore
 Jocie Guo's profile at Warner Music Taiwan
 Guo Mei Mei's (Jocie Guo/Jocie Guo) page at the Sina's Entertainment section
 Guo Mei Mei's (Jocie Guo/Jocie Guo) blog at the popular Chinese infotainment portal Sina.com
 Guo Mei Mei's Tudou video log - The video log site of Guo Mei Mei (Jocie Guo/Jocie Guo) at Tudou (Chinese)

1982 births
Living people
21st-century Singaporean women singers
Singaporean Mandopop singers
Singaporean people of Chinese descent
Singapore Polytechnic alumni